Eucratides I (Eukratídēs, reigned 172/171–145 BC) was one of the most important Greco-Bactrian kings. Eucratides overthrew the Euthydemid dynasty and restored the Diodotids to power. He fought against the easternmost Hellenistic and Indian rulers in India, holding territory in the Indus and as far as Barigaza until he was finally defeated by Menander and pushed back to Bactria. Eucratides minted a vast and prestigious coinage, suggesting a rule of considerable importance and prosperity. His son, Heliocles I, was the last Greek king to rule in Bactria, as the Yuezhi overran the country c. 120 BC.

Biography

Early life
Eucratides was born c.204 BC in the Hellenistic city of Ai-Khanoum, to 'Heliocles' and 'Laodice' as depicted on various finds of his coinage. His parents were likely members of the ousted Diodotid dynasty. It is unclear exactly what background or motive Eucratides had, or whether he and his family held any positions of rank during the reigns of Euthydemus I and Demetrius I.

Coup d'état 
Eucratides came to the throne by overthrowing the Euthydemid dynasty in Bactria, possibly when its king, Demetrius was conquering northwestern India. The king whom Eucratides dethroned in Bactria was probably Antimachus I.

It is unclear whether Eucratides was a Diodotid Bactrian nobleman who raised a rebellion, or, according to the claims of some scholars, a cousin of the Seleucid king Antiochus IV Epiphanes who was trying to regain the Bactrian territory. The Seleucid claim is highly unlikely and has been discredited by modern historians, and it is believed that Eucratides mother, Laodice was solely of the Diodotid dynasty. Justin explains that Eucratides acceded to the throne at about the same time as Mithridates, whose rule is accurately known to have started in 171 BC, thereby giving an approximate date for the accession of Eucratides:

Some of the coins of Eucratides represent his parents, where his father is named Heliocles, and his mother, Laodice, who is depicted wearing a royal diadem and therefore of royal descent. Narain and other modern authors propose that she was a daughter of Diodotus I.

Having become master of Bactria after de-throning the Euthydemid dynasty, Eucratides was faced with a Parthian invasion which began when Demetrius I was conquering India. Having taken Tapuria and Margiana from Demetrius in about 170 BC, the powerful Mithridates I attempted to conquer Bactria itself but was checked by Eucratides who wisely reformed the Diodotid alliance with the Parthia, likely paying a sum of Indian war-Elephants. Having secured his western borders, Eucratides then conquered parts of the India, campaigning as far south as Barigaza (modern day Bharuch), solidifying Greek presence in Northern India with the Indo-Greek Kingdom.  According to the single remaining source, Roman historian Justin, Eucratides defeated Demetrius of India, but the identity of this king is uncertain: he could be either Demetrius I, or Demetrius II, but more likely Menander I.

"Eucratides led many wars with great courage, and, while weakened by them, was put under siege by Demetrius, king of the Indians. He made numerous sorties, and managed to vanquish 60,000 enemies with 300 soldiers, and thus liberated after four months, he put India under his rule" Justin XLI,6

Numismatic evidence suggests that Eucratides I was a contemporary of the Indo-Greek kings Apollodotus I, Apollodotus II and Diodotus III. In any case, Eucratides' advances into India are proved by his abundant bilingual coinage that are spread all over northern India and Pakistan.

The city of Eucratideia (Εὐκρατίδεια), which is mentioned by ancient Greek geographers as city of great wealth straddling the Oxus River, was probably named after Eucratides. It might have been a totally new foundation or an existing city which he had renamed after himself. The location of the city is uncertain, but it was probably Ai-Khanoum or perhaps Dilbarjin.

Death

Justin ends his account of Eucratides' life by claiming that the warlike king was murdered on his way back from India by his son, who hated Eucratides so much that he mutilated and dragged his dead body after his chariot. This may have been a misinterpretation by Justin, and the regicide could instead have been perpetrated by an Euthydemid prince, Demetrius II, the son and successor of Demetrius I. Justin appears to believe Eucratides was killed by his own son, Heliocles I, but this is unlikely as patricide was uncommon in the Hellenistic age.

"As Eucratides returned from India, he was killed on the way back by his son, who ran his chariot over the blood of the king, and ordered the corpse to be left without a sepulture" Justin XLI,6

The murder of Eucratides probably brought about a civil war amongst the members of the dynasty. The successors to Eucratides were Eucratides II and Heliocles I (145–130 BC), who was the last Greek king to reign in Bactria. Once the Yuezhi tribes overpowered Heliocles, the Greco-Bactrians lost control of the provinces north of the Hindu Kush.

Two other members of the dynasty were Plato of Bactria and probably Demetrius II, who in that case was not identical with the king Justin claimed was the enemy of Eucratides I.

The rule of the Greco-Bactrians soon crumbled following these numerous wars:

"The Bactrians, involved in various wars, lost not only their rule but also their freedom, as, exhausted by their wars against the Sogdians, the Arachotes, the Dranges, the Arians and the Indians, they were finally crushed, as if drawn of all their blood, by an enemy weaker than them, the Parthians." Justin, XLI,6

However, the rule of the Indo-Greeks over territories south of the Hindu Kush lasted for a further 150 years, ultimately collapsing under the pressure of the Yüeh-chih and Scythian (Saka) invasions in around 10 BC, with the last Indo-Greek ruler Strato II.

Modern

Da Afghanistan Bank which is the central bank of Afghanistan, in its seal has a Eucratides I-era coin having the Greek text, "ΒΑΣΙΛΕΩΣ ΜΕΓΑΛΟΥ ΕΥΚΡΑΤΙΔΟΥ" which means “Of the great king Eucratides.”

Sources
Full account of Justin on Eucratides:

Gallery

See also
 History of Afghanistan
 Heliocles I

Notes

References
 The Shape of Ancient Thought. Comparative studies in Greek and Indian Philosophies by Thomas McEvilley (Allworth Press and the School of Visual Arts, 2002) 
 Buddhism in Central Asia by B. N. Puri (Motilal Banarsidass Pub, 1 January 2000) 
 The Greeks in Bactria and India, W. W. Tarn, Cambridge University Press.

External links

 Coins of Eucratides
 More coins of Eucratides
 Catalogue of the Coins of Eucratides I

Greco-Bactrian kings
145 BC deaths
2nd-century BC rulers in Asia
Year of birth unknown
Usurpers
Diodotid dynasty